DAC 1912 FC was a Hungarian football club based in Győr.

The termination and bankruptcy
Integrál-DAC failed to appear in the 2009–10 season schedule despite finishing 11th in the Nemzeti Bajnokság II Western Division. The club ceased operations in late 2009.

Link
 Official site
 Official Website, English Version

Sport in Győr
Defunct football clubs in Hungary
1912 establishments in Hungary
2009 disestablishments in Hungary